Bob Carmichael (11 February 1882 – 23 February 1954) was  a former Australian rules footballer who played with Collingwood in the Victorian Football League (VFL).

Notes

External links 
		
Bob Carmichael's profile at Collingwood Forever

1882 births
1954 deaths
Australian rules footballers from Victoria (Australia)
Collingwood Football Club players